The Braille pattern dots-23456 is a 6-dot braille cell with the top right, both middle, and both bottom dots raised, or an 8-dot braille cell with the top right, both upper-middle, and both lower-middle dots raised. It is represented by the Unicode code point U+283e, and in Braille ASCII with a close parenthesis).

Unified Braille

In unified international braille, the braille pattern dots-23456 is used to represent an unvoiced dental or alveolar plosive, such as /t/ or /t̪/ when multiple letters correspond to these values, and is otherwise assigned as needed.

Table of unified braille values

Other braille

Plus dots 7 and 8

Related to Braille pattern dots-23456 are Braille patterns 234567, 234568, and 2345678, which are used in 8-dot braille systems, such as Gardner-Salinas and Luxembourgish Braille.

Related 8-dot kantenji patterns

In the Japanese kantenji braille, the standard 8-dot Braille patterns 35678, 135678, 345678, and 1345678 are the patterns related to Braille pattern dots-23456, since the two additional dots of kantenji patterns 023456, 234567, and 0234567 are placed above the base 6-dot cell, instead of below, as in standard 8-dot braille.

Kantenji using braille patterns 35678, 135678, 345678, or 1345678

This listing includes kantenji using Braille pattern dots-23456 for all 6349 kanji found in JIS C 6226-1978.

  - 門

Variants and thematic compounds

  -  selector 4 + も/門  =  以
  -  selector 5 + も/門  =  鬥
  -  selector 6 + も/門  =  芻
  -  も/門 + selector 1  =  気
  -  も/門 + selector 1 + selector 1  =  气
  -  も/門 + selector 2  =  包
  -  も/門 + selector 2 + selector 2  =  勹
  -  も/門 + selector 3  =  区
  -  も/門 + selector 3 + selector 3  =  匚
  -  も/門 + selector 5  =  句
  -  も/門 + selector 6  =  凶
  -  も/門 + selector 6 + selector 6  =  凵
  -  比 + も/門  =  勺

Compounds of 門

  -  る/忄 + も/門  =  憫
  -  心 + も/門  =  蘭
  -  も/門 + れ/口  =  問
  -  も/門 + れ/口 + れ/口  =  闡
  -  も/門 + 心  =  悶
  -  も/門 + 宿 + ひ/辶  =  闌
  -  も/門 + ひ/辶  =  欄
  -  に/氵 + も/門 + ひ/辶  =  瀾
  -  火 + も/門 + ひ/辶  =  爛
  -  ね/示 + も/門 + ひ/辶  =  襴
  -  も/門 + み/耳  =  聞
  -  も/門 + な/亻  =  閃
  -  も/門 + ろ/十  =  閉
  -  も/門 + と/戸  =  開
  -  も/門 + へ/⺩  =  閏
  -  も/門 + き/木  =  閑
  -  ふ/女 + も/門 + き/木  =  嫻
  -  も/門 + 日  =  間
  -  つ/土 + も/門 + 日  =  墹
  -  も/門 + け/犬  =  関
  -  も/門 + も/門 + け/犬  =  關
  -  も/門 + す/発  =  閣
  -  て/扌 + も/門 + す/発  =  擱
  -  も/門 + 囗  =  閥
  -  も/門 + こ/子  =  閧
  -  も/門 + つ/土  =  閨
  -  も/門 + 宿  =  閲
  -  も/門 + ま/石  =  闇
  -  も/門 + し/巿  =  闘
  -  ふ/女 + も/門 + ら/月  =  嫺
  -  火 + も/門 + 日  =  燗
  -  や/疒 + も/門 + ら/月  =  癇
  -  い/糹/#2 + も/門 + ら/月  =  繝
  -  な/亻 + 宿 + も/門  =  們
  -  て/扌 + 宿 + も/門  =  捫
  -  心 + 龸 + も/門  =  椚
  -  も/門 + に/氵 + せ/食  =  濶
  -  み/耳 + 宿 + も/門  =  躙
  -  み/耳 + 龸 + も/門  =  躪
  -  も/門 + 宿 + 宿  =  閂
  -  も/門 + 比 + 龸  =  閇
  -  も/門 + や/疒 + selector 1  =  閊
  -  も/門 + 龸 + selector 3  =  閔
  -  も/門 + 宿 + に/氵  =  閖
  -  も/門 + 宿 + こ/子  =  閘
  -  も/門 + 龸 + し/巿  =  閙
  -  も/門 + う/宀/#3 + へ/⺩  =  閠
  -  も/門 + り/分 + 囗  =  閤
  -  も/門 + selector 6 + み/耳  =  閭
  -  も/門 + selector 6 + 心  =  閹
  -  も/門 + 宿 + ぬ/力  =  閻
  -  も/門 + ほ/方 + 龸  =  閼
  -  も/門 + 囗 + selector 4  =  閾
  -  も/門 + め/目 + け/犬  =  闃
  -  も/門 + れ/口 + せ/食  =  闊
  -  も/門 + と/戸 + 日  =  闍
  -  も/門 + つ/土 + こ/子  =  闔
  -  も/門 + ん/止 + selector 1  =  闕
  -  も/門 + 宿 + そ/馬  =  闖
  -  も/門 + 宿 + ま/石  =  闢
  -  も/門 + ひ/辶 + た/⽥  =  闥

Compounds of 以

  -  な/亻 + も/門  =  似
  -  心 + selector 4 + も/門  =  苡

Compounds of 鬥

  -  も/門 + も/門 + こ/子  =  鬨
  -  も/門 + も/門 + し/巿  =  鬪
  -  も/門 + う/宀/#3 + し/巿  =  鬧
  -  も/門 + こ/子 + 宿  =  鬩
  -  も/門 + 比 + め/目  =  鬮

Compounds of 芻

  -  も/門 + い/糹/#2  =  雛
  -  く/艹 + selector 6 + も/門  =  蒭
  -  も/門 + selector 4 + ひ/辶  =  皺
  -  さ/阝 + 宿 + も/門  =  鄒

Compounds of 気 and 气

  -  に/氵 + も/門  =  汽
  -  も/門 + も/門 + selector 1  =  氣
  -  る/忄 + も/門 + selector 1  =  愾
  -  り/分 + も/門 + selector 1  =  氛
  -  も/門 + 囗 + け/犬  =  氤

Compounds of 包 and 勹

  -  て/扌 + も/門  =  抱
  -  ま/石 + も/門  =  砲
  -  ら/月 + も/門  =  胞
  -  ち/竹 + も/門  =  雹
  -  せ/食 + も/門  =  飽
  -  も/門 + ふ/女  =  匐
  -  ⺼ + も/門  =  胸
  -  も/門 + む/車  =  勾
  -  も/門 + に/氵  =  匂
  -  も/門 + ほ/方  =  匍
  -  け/犬 + も/門 + selector 2  =  匏
  -  れ/口 + も/門 + selector 2  =  咆
  -  つ/土 + も/門 + selector 2  =  垉
  -  よ/广 + も/門 + selector 2  =  庖
  -  き/木 + も/門 + selector 2  =  枹
  -  火 + も/門 + selector 2  =  炮
  -  や/疒 + も/門 + selector 2  =  疱
  -  ひ/辶 + も/門 + selector 2  =  皰
  -  く/艹 + も/門 + selector 2  =  苞
  -  む/車 + も/門 + selector 2  =  蚫
  -  ね/示 + も/門 + selector 2  =  袍
  -  か/金 + も/門 + selector 2  =  鉋
  -  め/目 + も/門 + selector 2  =  靤
  -  と/戸 + も/門 + selector 2  =  鞄
  -  せ/食 + も/門 + selector 2  =  鮑
  -  す/発 + も/門 + selector 2  =  麭
  -  る/忄 + 宿 + も/門  =  恟
  -  も/門 + 宿 + た/⽥  =  甸
  -  も/門 + と/戸 + う/宀/#3  =  髱
  -  心 + う/宀/#3 + も/門  =  蒟
  -  も/門 + へ/⺩ + す/発  =  麹

Compounds of 区 and 匚

  -  そ/馬 + も/門  =  駆
  -  そ/馬 + そ/馬 + も/門  =  驅
  -  も/門 + を/貝  =  匠
  -  も/門 + 龸  =  匹
  -  も/門 + や/疒  =  医
  -  も/門 + も/門 + や/疒  =  醫
  -  も/門 + 数  =  匿
  -  る/忄 + も/門 + 数  =  慝
  -  も/門 + ん/止  =  欧
  -  も/門 + も/門 + ん/止  =  歐
  -  も/門 + の/禾  =  殴
  -  も/門 + も/門 + の/禾  =  毆
  -  も/門 + せ/食  =  鴎
  -  も/門 + も/門 + selector 3  =  區
  -  え/訁 + も/門  =  謳
  -  れ/口 + も/門  =  嘔
  -  仁/亻 + も/門 + selector 3  =  傴
  -  け/犬 + も/門 + selector 3  =  奩
  -  ふ/女 + も/門 + selector 3  =  嫗
  -  や/疒 + も/門 + selector 3  =  嶇
  -  み/耳 + も/門 + selector 3  =  躯
  -  な/亻 + 龸 + も/門  =  偃
  -  も/門 + 宿 + し/巿  =  匝
  -  も/門 + へ/⺩ + selector 1  =  匡
  -  も/門 + 数 + こ/子  =  匣
  -  も/門 + selector 4 + 火  =  匪
  -  も/門 + 氷/氵 + い/糹/#2  =  匯
  -  も/門 + を/貝 + き/木  =  匱
  -  も/門 + 宿 + り/分  =  匳
  -  も/門 + 宿 + selector 3  =  匸
  -  つ/土 + 宿 + も/門  =  堰
  -  き/木 + 宿 + も/門  =  框
  -  心 + 宿 + も/門  =  榧
  -  も/門 + む/車 + selector 2  =  翳

Compounds of 句

  -  と/戸 + も/門  =  局
  -  み/耳 + と/戸 + も/門  =  跼
  -  け/犬 + も/門  =  狗
  -  ん/止 + も/門  =  齣
  -  な/亻 + も/門 + selector 5  =  佝
  -  ぬ/力 + も/門 + selector 5  =  劬
  -  る/忄 + も/門 + selector 5  =  怐
  -  心 + も/門 + selector 5  =  枸
  -  火 + も/門 + selector 5  =  煦
  -  く/艹 + も/門 + selector 5  =  苟
  -  も/門 + 氷/氵  =  敬
  -  も/門 + ゑ/訁  =  警
  -  も/門 + そ/馬  =  驚
  -  き/木 + も/門 + 氷/氵  =  檠
  -  か/金 + も/門 + selector 5  =  鉤

Compounds of 凶 and 凵

  -  宿 + も/門 + selector 6  =  兇
  -  心 + も/門 + selector 6  =  椶
  -  も/門 + も/門 + selector 6  =  匈
  -  に/氵 + も/門 + selector 6  =  洶
  -  も/門 + selector 6 + か/金  =  甌

Compounds of 勺

  -  日 + も/門  =  的
  -  い/糹/#2 + も/門  =  約
  -  く/艹 + い/糹/#2 + も/門  =  葯
  -  か/金 + も/門  =  釣
  -  ふ/女 + 比 + も/門  =  妁
  -  き/木 + 比 + も/門  =  杓
  -  火 + 比 + も/門  =  灼
  -  心 + 比 + も/門  =  芍
  -  せ/食 + 比 + も/門  =  酌
  -  つ/土 + も/門  =  均
  -  か/金 + 宿 + も/門  =  鈞
  -  ま/石 + 宿 + も/門  =  韵

Other compounds

  -  り/分 + も/門  =  余
  -  ゆ/彳 + も/門  =  徐
  -  ひ/辶 + も/門  =  途
  -  さ/阝 + も/門  =  除
  -  た/⽥ + り/分 + も/門  =  畭
  -  心 + り/分 + も/門  =  荼
  -  む/車 + り/分 + も/門  =  蜍
  -  り/分 + り/分 + も/門  =  餘
  -  よ/广 + も/門  =  唐
  -  の/禾 + も/門  =  糖
  -  つ/土 + よ/广 + も/門  =  塘
  -  に/氵 + よ/广 + も/門  =  溏
  -  こ/子 + も/門  =  巧
  -  き/木 + も/門  =  朽
  -  氷/氵 + も/門  =  汚
  -  も/門 + ぬ/力  =  勘
  -  も/門 + さ/阝  =  邸
  -  ん/止 + 宿 + も/門  =  丐
  -  り/分 + 宿 + も/門  =  兮
  -  め/目 + 宿 + も/門  =  盻
  -  ふ/女 + 宿 + も/門  =  娉
  -  も/門 + 宿 + 氷/氵  =  攷
  -  も/門 + 囗 + の/禾  =  粤
  -  す/発 + 宿 + も/門  =  虧
  -  え/訁 + 宿 + も/門  =  諡
  -  も/門 + ほ/方 + そ/馬  =  尠
  -  も/門 + 宿 + 囗  =  戡
  -  も/門 + 比 + と/戸  =  斟

Notes

Braille patterns